Hotel Last Resort is the tenth studio album by American rock band Violent Femmes. The album was released on July 26, 2019, by Add It Up Productions and PIAS Recordings. The cover art is a picture of the Eastlink hotel sculpture in Australia.

Critical reception

Hotel Last Resort received generally positive reviews from critics. At Metacritic, which assigns a normalized rating out of 100 to reviews from critics, the album received an average score of 68, which indicates "generally favorable reviews", based on 12 reviews.

Track listing

Personnel
 Gordon Gano – lead vocals, guitars
 Brian Ritchie – acoustic bass guitar, baritone guitar, percussion, vocals
 John Sparrow – drums, percussion, vocals
 Blaise Garza – contrabass, baritone and sopranino saxophones; piano, harmonium, theremin, vocals
 Tom Verlaine – guitar (track 6)
 Stefan Janoski – vocals (track 3)
 Aixa Vilar, Go Betty Go, Michelle Rangel, Nicolette Vilar, Todd Piotrowski – vocals (track 1)

Charts

References

2019 albums
Violent Femmes albums